Sanbe Dam is a gravity dam located in Shimane Prefecture in Japan. The dam is used for flood control and water supply. The catchment area of the dam is 25.5 km2. The dam impounds about 46  ha of land when full and can store 7120 thousand cubic meters of water. The construction of the dam was started on 1980 and completed in 1996.

References

Dams in Shimane Prefecture
1996 establishments in Japan